Sir John Edward George Bayley, 2nd Baronet (23 December 1793 – 23 December 1871) was an English baronet and amateur cricketer.

Born in London, he was the son of Sir John Bayley, 1st Baronet and his wife Elizabeth, the youngest daughter of John Markett. Bayley was called to the bar by the Inner Temple in 1835 and went then to the Northern Circuit. He succeeded his father as baronet in 1841.

Bayley played first-class cricket from 1817 to 1832. Mainly associated with Marylebone Cricket Club (MCC), he made 11 known appearances in first-class matches. He represented the Gentlemen in the Gentlemen v Players series.

In 1822, he married firstly Charlotte, the daughter of John Minet Fector the elder. After her death in 1854, Bayley remarried Selina Marley. He died at Kensington in 1871 and was succeeded in the baronetcy by his son John. The couple's second son was Hon. Lyttleton Holyoake Bayley.

References

1793 births
1871 deaths
Baronets in the Baronetage of the United Kingdom
English cricketers of 1787 to 1825
English cricketers of 1826 to 1863
Gentlemen cricketers
Marylebone Cricket Club cricketers
Members of the Inner Temple
Hampshire cricketers
English cricketers
Presidents of the Marylebone Cricket Club